Nelson Somerville Rulison (April 24, 1842 – September 1, 1897) was second bishop of Central Pennsylvania.

Biography
Rulison was born on April 24, 1842 in Carthage, New York, born to a family whose ancestors were German nobles. He studied at the General Theological Seminary in New York City and graduated in 1866 after which he was ordained deacon. He served as assistant minister of the Church of the Annunciation in New York City. In 1867, he became rector of Zion Church in Morris, New York. In 1876 he transferred to Cleveland, Ohio to become rector of St Paul's Church.

Rulison was elected Assistant Bishop of Central Pennsylvania (present day Diocese of Bethlehem) on June 12, 1884. He was subsequently consecrated on October 28, 1884 by Presiding Bishop Alfred Lee and co-consecrate by William Bacon Stevens, Bishop of Pennsylvania and Samuel Smith Harris, Bishop of Michigan. He was consecrated in St Paul's Church in Cleveland, Ohio. He became Bishop of Central Pennsylvania in 1891.

He died in Mannheim, Germany on September 1, 1897.

References

 Jonathan Wesley Miller, History of the Diocese of Central Pennsylvania, 1871-1909 (1909)

1842 births
1897 deaths
19th-century Anglican bishops in the United States
People from Carthage, New York
Episcopal bishops of Central Pennsylvania
Episcopal bishops of Bethlehem
General Theological Seminary alumni